New Groove is an album by saxophonist Bud Shank released on the Pacific Jazz label. The album features trumpeter Carmell Jones.

Reception

Oscar Peterson, commenting on the track "Well You Needn't" in 1961, criticized Peacock, saying: "the bass line and the bass projection [...] take away from a lot of the soloists". AllMusic rated the album with 3 stars.

Track listing
All compositions by Bud Shank, except as indicated.
 "New Groove" - 6:45
 "The Awakening" - 4:23
 "White Lightnin'" - 5:20
 "Sultry Serenade" (Tyree Glenn) - 7:20
 "Well You Needn't" (Thelonious Monk) - 6:58
 "Liddledabulduya" (Gary Peacock) - 4:55

Personnel 
Bud Shank - alto saxophone, baritone saxophone
Carmell Jones - trumpet
Dennis Budimir - guitar
Gary Peacock - bass
Mel Lewis - drums

References 

1961 albums
Pacific Jazz Records albums
Bud Shank albums